The Bangladesh Rural Electrification Board or BREB, is government organization in Dhaka, Bangladesh and is responsible for rural electrification. It is the largest power distribution organization in Bangladesh. BREB has brought all the 461 upazilas on grid under 100% electrification. Md Selim Uddin, an additional secretary is the present chairman of the board.

History
The Rural Electrification Board was established in 1977. It implements electrification of rural areas in Bangladesh and builds electrics lines and sub stations. It counterpart Bangladesh Power Development Board manages electric distribution in urban areas. Palli Bidyut Samities in a subsidiary of the board and acts as a consumer cooperative. The board has expanded rural electric connections rapidly. It has taken some market shares of solar energy.

Board members
There are 12 member of board.
 Chairman
 Member Admin
 Member Finance
 Member Distribution and Operation
 Member Planning and Development
 Member Samity Management
 Member BSCIC
 Member BADC
 Member PGCB
 Member ICAB
 Member BRDB
 Member BPDB

Zones
 Barisal Zone
 Chattagram Zone
 Dhaka Zone
 Khulna Zone
 Mymensingh Zone
 Rajshahi Zone
 Rangpur Zone
 Sylhet Zone

List of Palli Bidyut Samity
There are 80 subsidiaries of BREB.
 Mymensingh Palli Bidyut Samity-1
 Mymensingh Palli Bidyut Samity-2
 Mymensingh Palli Bidyut Samity-3
 Tangail Palli Bidyut Samity
 Pabna Palli Bidyut Samity-1
 Pabna Palli Bidyut Samity-2
 Dhaka Palli Bidyut Samity-1
 Dhaka Palli Bidyut Samity-2
 Dhaka Palli Bidyut Samity-3
 Dhaka Palli Bidyut Samity-4
 Gazipur Palli Bidyut Samity-1
 Gazipur Palli Bidyut Samity-2
 Netrokona Palli Bidyut Samity
 Chattagram Palli Bidyut Samity-1
 Chattagram Palli Bidyut Samity-2
 Feni Palli Bidyut Samity
 Comilla Palli Bidyut Samity-1
 Comilla Palli Bidyut Samity-2
 Comilla Palli Bidyut Samity-3
 Comilla Palli Bidyut Samity-4
 Chattagram Palli Bidyut Samity-3
 Chandpur Palli Bidyut Samity-2
 Chandpur Palli Bidyut Samity-1
 Cox'sbazar Palli Bidyut Samity
 Narayanganj Palli Bidyut Samity
 Sylhet Palli Bidyut Samity-1
 Sylhet Palli Bidyut Samity-2
 Sunamganj Palli Bidyut Samity
 Kishoreganj Palli Bidyut Samity
 Jamalpur Palli Bidyut Samity
 Khulna Palli Bidyut Samity
 Barishal Palli Bidyut Samity-1
 Barishal Palli Bidyut Samity-2
 Dinajpur Palli Bidyut Samity-1
 Dinajpur Palli Bidyut Samity-2
 Natore Palli Bidyut Samity-1
 Natore Palli Bidyut Samity-2
 Jhalakathi Palli Bidyut Samity
 Munshiganj Palli Bidyut Samity
 Shariyatpur Palli Bidyut Samity
 Madaripur Palli Bidyut Samity
 Faridpur Palli Bidyut Samity
 Gaibandha Palli Bidyut Samity
 Gopalganj Palli Bidyut Samity
 Bagerhat Palli Bidyut Samity
 Bhola Palli Bidyut Samity
 Bogra Palli Bidyut Samity-1
 Bogra Palli Bidyut Samity-2
 Bhrammanbaria Palli Bidyut Samity
 Chapainawabganj Palli Bidyut Samity
 Habiganj Palli Bidyut Samity
 Jessore Palli Bidyut Samity-1
 Jessore Palli Bidyut Samity-2
 Jhenaidaha Palli Bidyut Samity
 Jaypurhat Palli Bidyut Samity
 Kustia Palli Bidyut Samity
 Kuri-lal Palli Bidyut Samity
 LakkhipurPalli Bidyut Samity
 Magura Palli Bidyut Samity

 Meherpur Palli Bidyut Samity
 Moulavibazar Palli Bidyut Samity
 Naogaon Palli Bidyut Samity-1
 Naogaon Palli Bidyut Samity-2
 Narasingdhi Palli Bidyut Samity-1
 Narasingdhi Palli Bidyut Samity-2
 Narayanganj Palli Bidyut Samity-2
 Nilphamari Palli Bidyut Samity
 Noakhali Palli Bidyut Samity
 Patuakhali Palli Bidyut Samity
 Pirojpur Palli Bidyut Samity
 Rajbari Palli Bidyut Samity
 Rajshahi Palli Bidyut Samity
 Rangpur Palli Bidyut Samity-1
 Rangpur Palli Bidyut Samity-2
 Sherpur Palli Bidyut Samity
 Sirajgonj Palli Bidyut Samity-1
 Sirajgonj Palli Bidyut Samity-2
 Shatkhira Palli Bidyut Samity
 Thakurgaon Palli Bidyut Samity
 Manikganj Palli Bidyut Samity

Central warehouses
 Central Warehouse, Dhaka
 Central Warehouse, Khulna
 Central Warehouse, Chattagram

References

1977 establishments in Bangladesh
Government-owned companies of Bangladesh
Organisations based in Dhaka
Energy in Bangladesh
Rural electrification